A Development Effectiveness Indicator (DEI) is a consolidated measure, used primarily by Development Finance Institutions (DFIs), of the development effectiveness achieved by an institution. 

DEI relates directly to the development results achieved through a particular development intervention or financed activity. The DEI is a composite aggregation of a range of performance measures that may incorporate interventions across various sectors within the development arena. The formulation of a development effectiveness indicator was motivated primarily by the limitations of current development effectiveness reviews and the need to provide a dynamic adaptive mechanism to track effectiveness and provide operational and strategic insight. The indicator was produced by Jason Bygate and Karl Meyer in 2016 in South Africa for emerging markets.

References

Effectiveness Indicator